Emotional Violence is an album by the American band Cameo, released in 1992.

Production
The album was produced by Larry Blackmon.

Critical reception

The Baltimore Sun wrote that "the album's rhythmic content is as rich as ever." The Chicago Tribune opined that Cameo goes "through the motions in a set of songs so spare and similar that they blur together into one big boring bass line." The Orlando Sentinel determined that "Cameo's arrangements are spacious and funky, the dance beats are compelling, and Blackmon even manages to sneak in worthwhile messages without putting a damper on the party he's starting."

Track listing
 "Emotional Violence"
 "Money"
 "Raw but Tasty"
 "Front Street"
 "Kid Don't Believe It"
 "Another Love"
 "Don't Crash" (feat. J-Train)
 "Love Yourself"
 "Nothing Less than Love"
 "That Kind of Guy"

References

Cameo (band) albums
1992 albums
Reprise Records albums